Pyramidella turrita is a species of sea snail, a marine gastropod mollusk in the family Pyramidellidae, the pyrams and their allies.

Description
The shell has a fulvous color, obsoletely maculated with a deeper tint. The whorls of the teleoconch are flattened. The suture is deep, crenulated and frequently whitish. The body whorl has a distinct median sulcus. The length of the shell varies between 22 mm and 24 mm.

Distribution
This marine species occurs in the following locations : 
 Northern Australia, New Caledonia.
 Indian Ocean off East Africa, and Durban, South Africa.

References

External links
 To World Register of Marine Species

Pyramidellidae
Gastropods described in 1855